Aleurothrixus is a genus of whiteflies in the family Aleyrodidae.

Species
Aleurothrixus aepim (Goeldi, 1886)
Aleurothrixus aguiari Costa Lima, 1942
Aleurothrixus antidesmae Takahashi, 1933
Aleurothrixus bondari Costa Lima, 1942
Aleurothrixus chivelensis Sampson & Drews, 1941
Aleurothrixus floccosus (Maskell, 1896) (woolly whitefly)
Aleurothrixus guareae Costa Lima, 1942
Aleurothrixus guimaraesi Costa Lima, 1942
Aleurothrixus interrogationis (Bemis, 1904)
Aleurothrixus lucumai Costa Lima, 1942
Aleurothrixus miconiae Hempel, 1922
Aleurothrixus myrtacei Bondar, 1923
Aleurothrixus myrtifolii Bondar, 1923
Aleurothrixus ondinae Bondar, 1923
Aleurothrixus porteri Quaintance & Baker, 1916
Aleurothrixus proximans Bondar, 1923
Aleurothrixus silvestris Corbett, 1935
Aleurothrixus similis Sampson & Drews, 1941
Aleurothrixus smilaceti Takahashi, 1934
Aleurothrixus solani Bondar, 1923

References

Whiteflies